Prodănești is a commune in Floreşti District, Moldova. It is composed of two villages, Căprești and Prodănești.

References

Communes of Florești District